Joe Louis Dudley, Sr. (born May 9, 1937) is an American businessman and hair-care entrepreneur. He is the president and chief executive officer for Dudley Products Inc., a manufacturer and distributor of hair and skin care products for the African American community.

Life and career
Dudley was born in Aurora, North Carolina, the fifth of 11 children. When he was in the first grade, he was mistakenly labeled as being mentally retarded because of a speech impediment. He was twice held back by the time he reached the eleventh grade. However, Dudley persevered in his education, eventually gaining a Bachelor of Science Degree in Business Administration from North Carolina Agricultural and Technical State University in Greensboro, North Carolina.

In 1957, Dudley was living in Brooklyn, New York. He invested $10 in a Fuller Products sales kit in 1957, and began selling hair care products door to door in African American neighborhoods. In 1960 he met Eunice Mosley, who was also selling Fuller products on a door-to-door basis. They married the following year.

The Dudleys settled in Greensboro, where they opened a Fuller distributorship. When there was a shortage of Fuller products in 1969, they began manufacturing and selling their own line under the Dudley Products label. Unlike many hair and skin care providers, Dudley chose to market his product line directly to salons rather than to retailers.

At the request of company founder S.B. Fuller, Dudley moved to Chicago, Illinois, and took over Fuller Products in 1976. They consolidated the company with their operations in 1980, keeping the Dudley Products brand name. Dudley moved the company back to Greensboro in 1984. As of December 2003, with annual revenues of $30 million, the company offers 400 hair and skin care products. It also operates the Dudley Cosmetology University, with locations in North Carolina and two schools in Zimbabwe. 

Dudley and his company were featured in Chris Rock's 2009 documentary Good Hair; the company is one of only a handful of African-American-owned companies manufacturing hair products for the African-American community.

References

External links
 Joe L. Dudley biography on dudleyq.com

1939 births
Living people
People from Beaufort County, North Carolina
Businesspeople from Greensboro, North Carolina
North Carolina A&T State University alumni